The Pauquachin First Nation is the band government of the Pauquachin group of North Straits Salish-speaking indigenous peoples.  Their reserve communities and traditional territories are located in the Greater Victoria area of Vancouver Island, British Columbia, Canada.

Native rights
They are a member of the Sencot'en Alliance fighting for Native rights.  In the 1850s they were signatories to the Douglas Treaties.

Chief and councillors

Treaty Process
Not participating in BC Treaty Process.

Demographics
The Pauquachin First Nation has 373 members.

References

Coast Salish governments
Southern Vancouver Island